The Hotels, Catering and Personal Services Union (HGPD) was a trade union representing workers in the hospitality industry in Austria.

The union was founded in 1978, when the Hotel and Restaurant Workers' Union merged with the Personal Service Workers' Union.  Like its forerunners, the union affiliated to the Austrian Trade Union Federation.

By 1998, the union had 50,320 members.  In 2006, it merged with the Railway Workers' Union and the Commerce and Transport Union, to form Vida.

Presidents
1978: Florian Mück
1987: Franz Erwin Niemitz

References

Hospitality industry trade unions
Trade unions established in 1978
Trade unions disestablished in 2006
Trade unions in Austria
1978 establishments in Austria
2006 disestablishments in Austria